The British Dietetic Association (BDA) is a professional association and trade union for dietitians in the United Kingdom. It was founded in 1936 and became a certified union in 1982: it is affiliated to the Trades Union Congress and the Scottish Trades Union Congress.

History of Dietetics and the BDA
Dietetics first began in the middle of the nineteenth century when Florence Nightingale observed the importance of diet and nutrition to convalescence from wars at that time.

Following the appearance of the first dietitians in the United States at the start of the twentieth century, the first UK dietitians came from nursing sisters, then working in hospitals. The Edinburgh Royal Infirmary was the first hospital known to develop a dietetic department in 1924. The Infirmary launched the first dietetic diploma course around ten years after the creation of its dietetic department.

The BDA’s history also emerged around the same time. The very first meeting of the Association was held on 24 January, 1936 at St Thomas’ Hospital in London. Since then, the BDA has grown into an internationally respected and valued organization.

Mission and scope
Its aims are to:
 Advance the science and practice of dietetics and associated subjects;
 Promote training and education in the science and practice of dietetics and associated subjects;
 Regulate the relations between dietitians and their employer through the BDA Trade Union.

Organization and membership
The BDA is a UK-wide membership organization representing over 9,000 dietitians and dietetic support workers. Members of the association may use the post-nominal MBDA. The association also awards fellowship status to member dietitians who have significantly contributed to the development of the field. Fellows use the post-nominal FBDA.

The BDA head office is in Birmingham. It has members from all four UK nations and some from overseas.

The majority of the BDA's membership work in the National Health Service. Approximately one third of the membership work in other sectors, such as education, private industry, private practice and the media.

In the UK, 'Dietitian' is a legally protected title. Unlike nutritionists and other food/nutrition titles, all dietitians are required to be educated to a certain level (a recognized UK degree level at least) and dietitians are the only food/nutrition professionals in the UK who must be regulated.

The BDA comprises five departments:

 The Executive Team – oversees the work with Board of Directors, finance, governance, etc.
 The Membership, Marketing and Communications Team – oversees member recruitment, retention and engagement activities, the volunteer program, marketing, communications, media and PR activities, and manages the internal systems including website and database.
 The Education and Professional Practice Team –  oversees education, practice and professional support activity
 The Trade Union and Public Affairs Team -  provides support, advice and representation across vital issues including pay awards, service provision, and for a range of workplace issues affecting members.
 The Business Administration Team – which provides administrative and technical support to members and the office

The BDA is a certified holder of the Information Standard. The Information Standard is a Department of Health certification scheme for health and social care information. Successful organizations can use the quality mark on materials to confirm that the information is from a reliable source.

Campaigns
The British Dietetic Association also administers the specialist register for dietitians and sports nutritionists (SeNR) working with elite sportspeople.

In 2011, the BDA Chairman at the time, Helen Davidson, announced the creation of a brand new BDA national campaign. The aim of the campaign was to highlight levels of malnutrition in older people living in their own homes in the UK. Mind the Hunger Gap was deemed a great success with wide coverage and publicity across the UK, including advising the UL soap Emmerdale on a community malnutrition storyline in early 2013.

The BDA launched the campaign 'Work Ready' in 2016, which aims to highlight work-based health.

The BDA has served as an advocate for consumers. In 2022, the BDA joined with other organizations calling for a halt to the sale of mislabelled baby food.

Publications 
The British Dietetic Association produces a monthly magazine called Dietetics Today. Its official journal is the Journal of Human Nutrition and Dietetics, which is published bimonthly by John Wiley & Sons.

See also

 List of diets

References

 Pat Judd, A History of the British Dietetic Association: The third twenty-five years 1986-2011, published by The British Dietetic Association 2011, . This can be downloaded free from the BDA website.
 John B. Smethurst, Peter Carter, "Historical Directory of Trade Unions: Including Unions In, Building and Construction, Agriculture, Fishing, Chemicals, Wood and Woodworking, Transport, Engineering and Metal Working, ...", Historical Directory of Trade Unions vol 6, Ashgate Publishing, Ltd., 2009, p. 428

External links
British Dietetic Association Homepage

Healthcare trade unions in the United Kingdom
Medical associations based in the United Kingdom
Organisations based in Birmingham, West Midlands
Organizations established in 1936
1936 establishments in the United Kingdom
Trade unions based in the West Midlands (county)
Trade unions affiliated with the Trades Union Congress